Siniša Martinović (born December 19, 1980 in Tuzla) is a Croatian professional ice hockey goaltender who currently plays for the Schwenninger Wild Wings of the 2nd Bundesliga.

References

External links

1980 births
Croatian ice hockey goaltenders
German ice hockey goaltenders
Hamburg Freezers players
Iserlohn Roosters players
Kassel Huskies players
Living people
Sportspeople from Tuzla
Straubing Tigers players